La Brillanne is a commune in the department of Alpes-de-Haute-Provence in southeastern France.

Population

Its inhabitants are referred to as Brillannais.

See also
Communes of the Alpes-de-Haute-Provence department

References

Communes of Alpes-de-Haute-Provence
Alpes-de-Haute-Provence communes articles needing translation from French Wikipedia